The Gross Seehorn (also spelled Großes Seehorn in German) is a mountain of the Silvretta Alps, located on the border between Austria and Switzerland.

The Gross Seehorn is the westernmost mountain rising above 3,000 metres in Austria.

References

External links
 Gross Seehorn on Hikr.org

Alpine three-thousanders
Austria–Switzerland border
International mountains of Europe
Mountains of the Alps
Mountains of Graubünden
Mountains of Vorarlberg
Mountains of Switzerland
Silvretta Alps
Klosters-Serneus